The Indian state of Goa is divided into two districts: North Goa and South Goa.

Administrative structure
North Goa is further divided into three subdivisions — Panaji, Mapusa, and Bicholim; and five talukas — Tiswadi (Panaji), Bardez (Mapusa), Pernem, Bicholim, and Sattari (Valpoi),
South Goa is further divided into five subdivisions — Ponda, Mormugao (Vasco da Gama), Margao, Quepem, and Dharbandora; and seven talukas — Ponda, Mormugao, Salcete (Margao), Quepem, and Canacona (Chaudi), Sanguem, and Dharbandora. (Ponda taluka shifted from North Goa to South Goa in January 2015).

Districts

References

External links

 http://www.goa.gov.in/

 
Districts
Goa